In geometry, a 10-simplex is a self-dual regular 10-polytope. It has 11 vertices, 55 edges, 165 triangle faces, 330 tetrahedral cells, 462 5-cell 4-faces, 462 5-simplex 5-faces, 330 6-simplex 6-faces, 165 7-simplex 7-faces, 55 8-simplex 8-faces, and 11 9-simplex 9-faces. Its dihedral angle is cos−1(1/10), or approximately 84.26°.

It can also be called a hendecaronnon, or hendeca-10-tope, as an 11-facetted polytope in 10-dimensions. The name hendecaronnon is derived from hendeca for 11 facets in Greek and -ronn (variation of ennea for nine), having 9-dimensional facets, and -on.

Coordinates 

The Cartesian coordinates of the vertices of an origin-centered regular 10-simplex having edge length 2 are:

More simply, the vertices of the 10-simplex can be positioned in 11-space as permutations of (0,0,0,0,0,0,0,0,0,0,1). This construction is based on facets of the 11-orthoplex.

Images

Related polytopes 

The 2-skeleton of the 10-simplex is topologically related to the 11-cell abstract regular polychoron which has the same 11 vertices, 55 edges, but only 1/3 the faces (55).

References
 Coxeter, H.S.M.: 
 
 
 (Paper 22) 
 (Paper 23) 
 (Paper 24)

External links 
 
 Polytopes of Various Dimensions
 Multi-dimensional Glossary

10-polytopes